Great Beauty may refer to:

Great oak beauty or Hypomecis roboraria, a moth of the family Geometridae
Great Auspicious Beauty, one of Seventeen Tantras of Menngagde, styles of meditation and ritual
A Great and Terrible Beauty, 2003 fantasy novel by Libba Bray
The Great Beauty, 2013 Italian film

See also
Four Great Beauties, four ancient Chinese women